The Swedish Crime Writers' Academy (Swedish: Svenska Deckarakademin), is a Swedish organization set up in 1971 to promote the writing of detective fiction and crime fiction. Originally, the academy had 13 elected members; today the number of members is 24.

Prizes awarded each year by the Academy:
 The Martin Beck Award (named after the fictional detective created by Maj Sjöwall and Per Wahlöö)
 The Best Swedish Crime Novel (Bästa svenska kriminalroman)
 The Gyllene Kofoten Award

There are also a number of awards which are presented on an irregular basis:
 Best Swedish debut novel (Bästa svenska Debut)
 Grand Master Award for Lifetime Achievement (Auszeichnung für das Lebenswerk – Grand Master)
 Best Fiction Book about crimes and crimes prosecution (Bästa faktabok)
 Award for outstanding translations (Berömvärd översättargärnung)
 Special Prize
 Special Grand Master Award (for achievements in crime fiction) (Besondere Ehrung für Verdienste in der Kriminalliteratur)

Awards presented in the past:
 Best Crime Novel Translated into Swedish – International
 Best Thriller for Children and Adolescents (Barn & ungsdomsdeckare)

References

External links 
 Official site 

Crime fiction
Swedish writers' organizations
1971 establishments in Sweden
Organizations established in 1971